Columbia River Bridge may refer to:

 Columbia River Bridge (Wenatchee, Washington)
 Columbia River Bridge (Bridgeport, Washington)

See also
 List of crossings of the Columbia River